Louder Than Bombs is a compilation album by English rock band the Smiths, released as a double album in March 1987 by their American record company, Sire Records. It peaked at number 62 on the US Billboard 200 album chart. Popular demand prompted their British record company, Rough Trade, to issue the album domestically as well. Upon its release in the UK in May 1987, it reached No. 38 on the British charts. In 2003, the album was ranked No. 365 on Rolling Stone magazine's list of The 500 Greatest Albums of All Time, and ranked No. 369 on a 2012 revised list. The album was certified Gold by the RIAA in 1990.

Release
The album was released as the American counterpart to their recent British compilation The World Won't Listen and consisted of all singles and nearly all B-sides that had not at that point been available in the United States, either on single or album, with a few other tracks added. The title is borrowed from a line in Elizabeth Smart's extended prose poem By Grand Central Station I Sat Down and Wept.

The album was intended to be a substitute for both The World Won't Listen and their 1984 compilation Hatful of Hollow, as these had not been released in the United States. This is why the non-single track "This Night Has Opened My Eyes" from Hatful of Hollow was included. Single A-sides "This Charming Man" and "How Soon Is Now?" had already been released in the US as bonus cuts on the LPs The Smiths and Meat Is Murder, respectively.

As with The World Won't Listen, this compilation includes the scrapped single "You Just Haven't Earned It Yet, Baby" (passed over in favour of "Shoplifters of the World Unite"), albeit in a different, shorter mix. However, this shorter version of the song was replaced when Bombs was reissued in 2011. Additionally, the Louder Than Bombs version of "Stretch Out and Wait" is the version from the B-side of "Shakespeare's Sister", which features slightly different lyrics. Also of note is the fact that "Ask" appears on both Louder Than Bombs and The World Won't Listen in a slightly different and longer mix than its single version.

Due to the album offering many B-sides (and the "Sheila Take a Bow" single) that had never been collected onto an album before, Louder Than Bombs became very popular on import with fans in the UK. To avoid high import prices being paid, the Smiths' domestic record company, Rough Trade, decided to release the compilation as well, provoking cries of outrage by fans who only three months previously had purchased the slimmer single album UK counterpart. The blow was somewhat softened by the fact that the double album retailed at single album price.

After WEA acquired the Smiths' back catalogue in 1992, all Smiths albums were re-released at mid price, including Louder Than Bombs.

Packaging
The cover art for Louder Than Bombs, designed by Morrissey, features British playwright Shelagh Delaney of Salford, Greater Manchester. The photograph was originally published in the Saturday Evening Post after Delaney, at the age of 19, made her literary debut with the play A Taste of Honey. The play inspired many early lyrics written by Morrissey, and the song "This Night Has Opened My Eyes" (included here) is based on the plight of the play's heroine, Jo, an unwed mother.

Track listing

Personnel
 Morrissey – vocals
 Johnny Marr – guitars, piano, harmonica, slide guitar on "Panic", mandolin on "Please Please Please Let Me Get What I Want" and "Golden Lights",
 Andy Rourke – bass guitar, cello on "Shakespeare's Sister" and "Oscillate Wildly"
 Mike Joyce – drums, tambourine on "Hand in Glove" and "Stretch Out and Wait"

Additional musicians
 Craig Gannon – rhythm guitar on "Half a Person", "London", "Panic", "You Just Haven't Earned It Yet, Baby", "Ask" and "Golden Lights", lead guitar on outro of "London", mandolin on "Golden Lights"
 Kirsty MacColl – backing vocals on "Ask" and "Golden Lights"
 John Porter – slide guitar on "Sheila Take a Bow", sound effects on "Ask", drum machine and bass guitar on "Golden Lights"
 Stephen Street – additional drum machine programming on "London", sampling on "Rubber Ring", sound effects on "Asleep"

Production
 Johnny Marr – producer (A3)
 Johnny Marr, Morrissey and Stephen Street – producers (A5–6)
 Morrissey and Marr – producers (A2, C5, D5–6)
 John Porter – producer (A1, A4, B1–2, B4–6, C1-2, C4, C6, D3)
 Roger Pusey – producer (D4)
 The Smiths – producers (B3, C3, D1–2)

Certifications

References

The Smiths compilation albums
Peel Sessions recordings
Albums produced by Stephen Street
B-side compilation albums
1987 live albums
1987 compilation albums
Rough Trade Records compilation albums
Rough Trade Records live albums
The Smiths live albums
Sire Records compilation albums
Sire Records live albums